Bullock County High School, originally named Union Springs High School and then Carver High School, is a public school serving about 370 student in grades 7 to 12 in Union Springs, Alabama. Hornets are the school mascot and black and old gold the school colors. It is in the Bullock County School District and serves grades 9 to 12.

In 2019 a new tax was proposed to fund renovations of the district schools. The school's enrollment has dropped in recent decades. Kelvin James is the school's principal. The school has a large proportion of economically disadvantaged students.

Sheldon Ward was hired as the school's new football coach in 2020. He replaced Willie Spears.

A new gym was completed at the school in 2013.

Alumni
Union Springs Municipal Judge John William Waters Jr. and City Prosecutor Carmella Penn are both alumni

References

Public high schools in Alabama
Education in Bullock County, Alabama